The Freedom Artist is a dystopian political novel by Nigerian novelist and poet Ben Okri. The first edition was published in 2019 by Akashic Books in the US and by Head of Zeus in the UK.

Reference

2019 Nigerian novels
Dystopian novels
Novels by Ben Okri
Akashic Books books
Head of Zeus books